Hatice Ozyurt (born ) is a Dutch female kickboxer and mixed martial artist, based in Steenwijk, Netherlands. She has competed professionally since 2010 and a WAKO-Pro runner up and mixed martial artist.

Kickboxing record (incomplete)

|- style="background:#fdd;"
|
| style="text-align:center;"|Loss
| Stephanie Ielö Page
| 
| Milzac, France
| style="text-align:center;"|Decision (majority)
|align=center|3
|align=center|3:00
| style="text-align:center;"|71-13-3
|-
! style=background:white colspan=9 |
|-
|- style="background:#fdd;"
|
| style="text-align:center;"|Loss
| Aledie Lewant
|Enfusion: A1 Combat Cup
| Eindhoven, Netherlands
| style="text-align:center;"|Decision (majority)
|align=center|3
|align=center|3:00
| style="text-align:center;"|71-12-3
|-
|- style="background:#fdd;"
|
| style="text-align:center;"|Loss
| Claire Haigh
|No Pain, No Muay Thai, Belgium
|
| style="text-align:center;"|	TKO
|align=center|3
|align=center|
| style="text-align:center;"|71-11-3
|-
|- style="background:#fdd;"
|
| style="text-align:center;"|Loss
| Katrin Dirheimer	
|Amazon of K1 Grand Prix Semi-Finals
| 
| style="text-align:center;"|Decision
|align=center|3
|align=center|3:00
| style="text-align:center;"|
|-
|- style="background:#cfc;"
|
| style="text-align:center;"|Win
| Lisa Schewe
|Amazon of K1 Grand Prix Quarter-Finals
| 
| style="text-align:center;"|Decision
|align=center|3
|align=center|3:00
| style="text-align:center;"|
|-
|- style="background:#fdd;"
|
| style="text-align:center;"|Loss
| Anke Van Gestel	
|It's Showtime
| Kortrijk, Belgium
| style="text-align:center;"|Decision (unanimous)
|align=center|3
|align=center|3:00
| style="text-align:center;"|
|-
|- style="background:#cfc;"
|
| style="text-align:center;"|Win
| Najat Hasnouni-Alaoui
|It's Showtime
| Kortrijk, Belgium
| style="text-align:center;"|Decision (unanimous)
|align=center|3
|align=center|3:00
| style="text-align:center;"|
|-
|- style="background:#cfc;"
|
| style="text-align:center;"|Win
| Ghizlane Aazri	
|World Arab Boxing Championships
| Dubai, UAE
| style="text-align:center;"|Decision (unanimous)
|align=center|3
|align=center|3:00
| style="text-align:center;"|
|-
|- style="background:#fdd;"
|
| style="text-align:center;"|Loss
| Aleide Lawant	
| 
| Noordwijkerhout, Netherlands
| style="text-align:center;"|Decision
|align=center|3
|align=center|3:00
| style="text-align:center;"|
|-
|- style="background:#cfc;"
|
| style="text-align:center;"|Win
| Lotte Wienbeck
|A1 World Combat Cupp 2011
| Eindhoven, Netherlands
| style="text-align:center;"|Decision
|align=center|5
|align=center|3:00
| style="text-align:center;"|
|-
|- style="background:#fdd;"
|
| style="text-align:center;"|Loss
| Julie Kitchen
| 
| Steenwijk, Netherlands
| style="text-align:center;"|Decision
|align=center|5
|align=center|2:00
| style="text-align:center;"|
|-
! style=background:white colspan=9 |
|-
|- style="background:#fdd;"
|
| style="text-align:center;"|Loss
| Germaine de Randamie
| 
| 
| style="text-align:center;"|Decision
|align=center|3
|align=center|3:00
| style="text-align:center;"|
|-
|- style="background:#fdd;"
|
| style="text-align:center;"|Loss
| Jorina Baars
| 
| 
| style="text-align:center;"|TKO
|align=center|4
|align=center|
| style="text-align:center;"|
|-
|- style="background:#fdd;"
|
| style="text-align:center;"|Loss
| Jorina Baars
| 
| 
| style="text-align:center;"|Decision
|align=center|3
|align=center|3:00
| style="text-align:center;"|
|-
|- style="background:#cfc;"
|
| style="text-align:center;"|Win
| Sam Mitchell
| 
| 
| style="text-align:center;"|Decision
|align=center|3
|align=center|2:00
| style="text-align:center;"|
|-
| colspan=9 | Legend:

Mixed martial arts record

|-
|Loss
|align=center| 2–7
|Leah McCourt
|TKO (doctor stoppage)
|Bellator 217
|
|align=center|1
|align=center|5:00
|Dublin, Ireland
|
|-
| Loss
| align=center| 2–6
| Cindy Dandois
| Submission (triangle choke)
| Battle Under the Tower
| 
| align=center| 2
| align=center| 1:46
| Steenwijk, Netherlands
| 
|-
| Loss
| align=center| 2–5
| Maiju Suotama
| Submission (choke)
| Carelia Fight 13
| 
| align=center| 1
| align=center| 4:13
| Imatria, South Karelia, Finland
| 
|-
| Loss
| align=center| 2–4
| Sinead Kavanagh
| TKO (punches)
| BAMMA 22: Duquesnoy vs. Loughnane
| 
| align=center| 1
| align=center| 0:17
| Dublin, Ireland
| 
|-
| Loss
| align=center| 2–3
| Ji Yeon Kim
| Submission (armbar)
| Road FC 23
| 
| align=center| 2
| align=center| 1:15
| Seoul, South Korea
| 
|-
| Loss
| align=center| 2–2
| Megan van Houtum
| Submission (armbar)
| Battle of the Kempen 2
| 
| align=center| 1
| align=center| 0:34
| Beek en Donk, Netherlands
| 
|-
| Loss
| align=center| 2–1
| Kamlia Balanda
| Submission (rear-naked choke)
| Respect Fighting Championships 7
| 
| align=center| 3
| align=center| 1:53
| Essen, Germany
| 
|-
| Win
| align=center| 2–0
| Lena Buytendijk 
| Decision (unanimous)
| Battle Under the Tower 
| 
| align=center| 2
| align=center| 5:00
| Steenwijk, Netherlands
| 
|-
| Win
| align=center| 1–0
| Lena Buytendijk 
| Decision (unanimous)
| Uitslagen Fight Night: The Battle of Gorredijk
| 
| align=center| 2
| align=center| 5:00
| Steenwijk, Netherlands
| 
|-

References

External links
 Official site
 Hatice Ozyurt Awakening profile

1987 births
Living people
Dutch female kickboxers
Dutch female mixed martial artists
Mixed martial artists utilizing Muay Thai
Dutch Muay Thai practitioners
Dutch people of Turkish descent
Female Muay Thai practitioners
People from Steenwijkerland
Sportspeople from Overijssel